The 2014 Jerusalem vehicular attack may refer to one of three terror attacks that occurred in Jerusalem in 2014.

August 2014 Jerusalem tractor attack
October 2014 Jerusalem vehicular attack
November 2014 Jerusalem vehicular attack